Eibau is a former municipality in the district Görlitz, in Saxony, Germany. Eibau is known for the Eibauer Schwarzbier (black beer) brewed by Münch-Bräu Eibau. With effect from 1 January 2013, it has merged with Niedercunnersdorf and Obercunnersdorf, forming the new municipality of Kottmar.

The conductor Arthur Apelt (1907–1993) was born in Eibau.

References 

Populated places in Görlitz (district)
Former municipalities in Saxony